Andreas D. Mavroyiannis (Modern Greek: Ανδρέας Δ. Μαυρογιάννης; born 20 July 1956) is a Cypriot diplomat and politician, who previously served as Ambassador to the United Nations, in addition to several other diplomatic postings.

Mavroyiannis served in the governments of Nicos Anastasiades and Demetris Christofias. He was the negotiator of the majority Greek Cypriot community in the Cyprus reunification talks between 2015 and 2017, and in 2012 served as Deputy Minister for European Affairs. He is also the former Cypriot representative to the European Union.

In the 2023 Cypriot presidential election, he was running as an independent candidate supported by the Progressive Party of Working People (AKEL) and Generation Change. In the first round he won 30% of the votes and qualifying to the second round. He lost in the second round to Nikos Christodoulides, receiving 48.08% of the votes, while Christodoulides received 51.92% of the votes.

References 

1956 births
Living people
21st-century Cypriot politicians
Permanent Representatives of Cyprus to the European Union
Permanent Representatives of Cyprus to the United Nations
Ambassadors of Cyprus to France
Ambassadors of Cyprus to Ireland
Aristotle University of Thessaloniki alumni
Paris 2 Panthéon-Assas University alumni
Cypriot diplomats
Government ministers of Cyprus
2023 Cypriot presidential election

Candidates for President of Cyprus
People from Limassol District